The Law Reform (Miscellaneous Provisions) (Scotland) Act 1990 (c 40) is an Act of Parliament of the United Kingdom dealing with a variety of matters relating to Scottish law.

Overview

Amongst other things the legislation addresses:
 regulation of charities; 
 regulation of conveyancing services by non-solicitors; 
 rights of audience in court;
 an ombudsman for legal services; 
 liquor licensing; 
 the giving of evidence by children in criminal trials; 
 jurisdiction of the sheriff court to try offences committed in another district; 
 probation and community service orders; 
 amendments to the Criminal Justice (Scotland) Act 1987 relating to confiscation orders; 
 amendments to the Housing (Scotland) Act 1987; 
 arbitration of international commercial disputes; 
 amendments to the Unfair Contract Terms Act 1977; and 
 other miscellaneous reforms of the law.

Arbitration

Section 66 of the Act provides for the UNCITRAL Model Law on International Commercial Arbitration to apply to Scotland.  The Model Law itself is set out in Schedule 7 to the Act.

Notes

Text of the Act is licensed under the Open Government Licence v3.0 (OGL v.3).

External links
Full text of the Act

1990 in Scotland
United Kingdom Acts of Parliament 1990
Arbitration law
Acts of the Parliament of the United Kingdom concerning Scotland